This is a list of Hungarian football transfers for the 2012–13 winter transfer window by club. Only transfers of clubs in the OTP Bank Liga are included.

The summer transfer window opened on 1 January 2013, although a few transfers took place prior to that date. The window closed at midnight on 24 February 2013. Players without a club could have joined one at any time, either during or in between transfer windows.

OTP Bank Liga

BFC Siófok

In:

Out:

Budapest Honvéd FC

In:

Out:

Debreceni VSC

In:

Out:

Diósgyőri VTK

In:

Out:

Egri FC

In:

Out:

Ferencvárosi TC

In:

Out:

Győri ETO FC

In:

Out:

Kaposvári Rákóczi FC

In:

Out:

Kecskeméti TE

In:

Out:

Lombard-Pápa TFC

In:

Out:

MTK Budapest FC

In:

Out:

Paksi SE

In:

Out:

Pécsi Mecsek FC

In:

Out:

Szombathelyi Haladás

In:

Out:

Újpest FC

In:

Out:

Videoton FC

In:

Out:

Nemzeti Bajnokság II

Eastern Group

Balmazújvárosi FC

In:

Out:

Békéscsaba 1912 Előre SE

In:

Out:

Budapest Honvéd FC II

In:

Out:

Ceglédi VSE

In:

Out:

Debreceni VSC II

In:

Out:

Ferencvárosi TC II

In:

Out:

References

External links
Nemzeti Sport 

Hungarian
Transfers
2012-13